Luo Junhan (born 3 May 2004) is a Chinese footballer currently playing as a defender for Guangzhou.

Career statistics

Club
.

References

2004 births
Living people
Chinese footballers
Association football defenders
Guangzhou F.C. players